The 2007 ONEFA season was the 77th season of college football in Mexico organized by ONEFA. The Big-12 conference was divided into three divisions (Cayetano Garza, Jacinto Licea and José Roberto Espinosa), with the top team in each division plus three wildcards qualifying for the playoffs. The Borregos Toluca were disqualified from the play-offs for fielding an ineligible player in a preseason game against the Aztecas UDLAP.

The Borregos Salvajes Monterrey won their fourth consecutive ONEFA national championship after defeating the Borregos Salvajes CEM 36–14 in the final.

Big-12
as October 20

Aguilas UACH will play on the National Conference in 2008.

Results

Week 1

Week 2

Week 3

Week 4

Week 5

Week 6

Week 7

Week 8

Week 9

Play-offs

Wildcards

Semifinals

Final

Aztec Bowl

On December 8 the 37th Aztec Bowl was played in Chihuahua City. The ONEFA All-Stars were defeated by the NCAA Division III All-Stars by a score of 37–19 in front of 18,500 spectators at the Estadio Olímpico Universitario. Enrique Borda Tovar (ITESM-CEM) coached the Mexican team.

Additionally, the Chihuahua Bowl was played between the National Conference All-Stars and Eastern Arizona College (EAC) on December 5, with Eastern Arizona winning 35–9. EAC running back Tony Reid was named the game's MVP after rushing for 130 yards and two touchdowns.

See also
 ONEFA

References

National Student Organization of American Football
ONEFA
ONEFA